The Kentucky Institute for International Studies or KIIS (pronounced like "keys") is a consortium of public and private Kentucky colleges and universities which administers a variety of international studies programs in Central America, Europe, South America, and China. It was founded by Murray State University in 1975.

Member institutions
Ball State University
Bellarmine University
Berea College
Bluegrass Community and Technical College
Bryan College (affiliate member; located in Tennessee)
Campbellsville University
Carson-Newman University (affiliate member; located in Tennessee)
Centre College
Eastern Kentucky University
Georgetown College
Kentucky State University
Middle Tennessee State University
Morehead State University
Murray State University
Northern Kentucky University
Transylvania University
Union College
University of Kentucky
University of Louisville
University of Pikeville
Western Kentucky University

External links
Official site
Entry in Peterson's Study Abroad, on Google Books
The Kentucky Institute for International Studies: A Consortium Approach to Study Abroad Essay by Professor J. Milton Grimes, February 1993, on Ibiblio.org 

1975 establishments in Kentucky
College and university associations and consortia in the United States
Education in Kentucky
Organizations established in 1975